Choe Won (born 25 November 1992) is a North Korean footballer who plays as a forward.

References

1992 births
Living people
North Korean footballers
North Korea international footballers
Association football forwards
2015 AFC Asian Cup players